Stonnington may refer to:

 City of Stonnington, a municipality in Melbourne, Australia
 Stonington mansion, a notable house in that city

See also  
 Stonington (disambiguation)